Craesus is a genus of insects belonging to the family Tenthredinidae.

The species of this genus are found in Europe and Northern America.

Species:
 Craesus alniastri
 Craesus latipes
 Craesus septentrionalis

References

Tenthredinidae
Sawfly genera